Vladimir Fyodorovich Minorsky ( – March 25, 1966) was a Russian academic, historian, and scholar of Oriental studies, best known for his contributions to the study of Persian, Lazi, Lurish, and Kurdish history, geography, literature, and culture.

Life and career
Minorsky was born in Korcheva, Tver Governorate, northwest of Moscow on the upper Volga River, a town now submerged beneath the Ivankovo Reservoir. There he was a gold medallist of the Fourth Grammar School. In 1896 he entered Moscow University to study law, graduating in 1900, then entered the Lazarev Institute of Oriental Languages where he spent 3 years preparing for a diplomatic career. He made his first trip to Iran (Qajar dynasty) in 1902, where he collected material on the Ahl-e Haqq.

In 1903 he entered the Russian Ministry of Foreign Affairs, serving 1904–1908 in the Qajar dynasty (now Iran), first in the Tabriz Consulate-General and then the Tehran Legation, and 1908–1912 in Saint Petersburg and Tashkent. In 1911, jointly the Four-Power (British, Russian, Turkish, and Persian) Commission, he carried out a mission in North-Western Persia to delimit the Turko-Persian border, and also published a monograph on the Ahl-i Ḥaqq religion for which he was awarded the Gold Medal of the Ethnography Section of the Imperial Society of Natural Sciences in Moscow.

One of the most important Kurdish manuscripts he obtained during this period was The Forqan ol-Akhbar, by Hajj Nematollah, which he later wrote about in "Etudes sur les Ahl-I Haqq, I.", Revue de L’Histoire des Religions, tome XCVII, No. 1, Janvier 1928, pp. 90–105. His surveys in Iran also provided invaluable material for his 1915 work, Materialï dlya izucheniya vostoka (Materials for the Study of the East), published by the Imperial Russian Ministry of Foreign Affairs, St. Petersburg.

From 1915-17 he served as Chargé d'affaires in the Russian Legation at Tehran. As the Bolshevik Revolution of 1917 made problematic his return to Russia, in 1919 he moved to Paris where he worked at the Russian Embassy. There his expertise in Middle Eastern and Caucasian affairs was useful during the Versaille and Trianon peace settlements.

In 1923 he began to lecture on Persian literature at the École nationale des langues orientales vivantes, where he subsequently taught Turkish and Islamic history. In 1930 he was named Oriental Secretary to the 1931 International Exhibition of Persian Art at Burlington House, London, and in 1932 was made lecturer in Persian at London's School of Oriental Studies. In 1933 he became Reader in Persian Literature and History, University of London; Professor of Persian in 1937; and in 1944 retired. During World War II, SOAS had evacuated to Christ's College, University of Cambridge, and there the Minorskys retired apart from a year (1948–49) at Fuad University, Cairo.

In 1934 Minorsky was one of the distinguished participants in the Ferdowsi Millenary Celebration in Tehran.

In 1960 Minorsky was invited by the Soviet Academy of Sciences to attend the meeting of the Twenty-Third International Congress of Orientalists in Moscow. After his death, his ashes were interred in the Novodevichy Cemetery, which was reserved exclusively for outstanding artists, literary men, composers, scholars, etc.; the bulk of his personal library was given to Leningrad.

Minorsky received numerous honors during his lifetime, including being made a Corresponding Fellow of the British Academy, 1943, Honorary Member of the Société Asiatique of Paris, 1946, and Doctor honoris causa of the University of Brussels, 1948.

Selected works
Minorsky was a prolific scholar, having published over 200 books and articles.
 "Ahl-I Hakk", in The Encyclopaedia of Islam.
 "Notes sur la secte des Ahl-I Haqq", in Revue du Monde Musulman, Volumes XL, 1920, pp. 20–97; XLIV-XLV, 1921, 205–302.
 Notes sur la secte des Ahle-Haqq, in book form, Paris, 1922, 182 pp., 1920.
 La Perse au xve siècle entre la Turquise et Venise, Paris: Leroux, 1933.
 "The Guran", Bulletin of the School of Oriental and African Studies, Volume, XI, 1943–1946, PP. 75–103.
 Studies in Caucasian history, Cambridge University Press, 1957.
 Medieval Iran and its neighbours, London, 1982. Reprint of journal articles in English or French published 1931–1967, with passages in Arabic, Gûrâni-Kurdish, Persian, and Turkic languages.
 A History of Sharvan and Darband in the 10th-11th Centuries, Cambridge, 1958.

See also
 Vasily Bartold
 Richard Nelson Frye
 Roman Ghirshman

References
 Retrospective by C. E. Bosworth
 The Zoroastrian Houses of Yazd
 
 
C. E. Bosworth, "MINORSKY, Vladimir Fed’orovich," Encyclopaedia Iranica, 2004, at http://www.iranicaonline.org/articles/minorsky-vladimir

External links

1877 births
1966 deaths
19th-century historians from the Russian Empire
20th-century Russian historians
Academics of SOAS University of London
Alumni of SOAS University of London
Burials at Novodevichy Cemetery
Corresponding Fellows of the British Academy
Emigrants from the Russian Empire to France
Emigrants from the Russian Empire to Iran
Emigrants from the Russian Empire to the United Kingdom
Historians of the Caucasus
Iranologists
Kurdish language
Linguists of Kurdish
Members of the Société Asiatique
Moscow State University alumni
People from Konakovsky District
People from Korchevskoy Uyezd
Russian orientalists
Shahnameh Researchers